Meskill is an unincorporated community off Washington State Route 6 in Lewis County, Washington.  The town is located near Rainbow Falls State Park, and rests between Ceres and Dryad. The Willapa Hills Trail bisects the area.

History
The site was originally owned by Francis Donahue and the town was named Donahue Spur in 1902.  The name of Meskill, taken from the Meskill Lumber Company, would be bestowed in 1905 to the post office, which lasted until 1920.

The mill burned down in 1921 nearly destroying the town. The lumber plant was never rebuilt. Though founded as a timber community, the town began a rock quarry in 1908 that helped provide the base for expanding railroad lines and to build a macadam road in the county. Inmates from local penitentiaries would work at the site and the town would often have to deal with escape attempts.

Government and politics

Politics

Meskill is recognized as being majority Republican and conservative.

The results for the 2020 U.S. Presidential Election for the Meskill voting district were as follows:

 Donald J. Trump (Republican) - 84 (71.19%)
 Joe Biden (Democrat) - 31 (26.27%)
 Jo Jorgensen (Libertarian) - 3 (2.54%)

References

Populated places in Lewis County, Washington
Unincorporated communities in Lewis County, Washington
Unincorporated communities in Washington (state)